The 2008 Cincinnati Masters (also known as the Western & Southern Financial Group Masters and Women's Open for sponsorship reasons) was a tennis tournament played on outdoor hard courts. It was the 107th edition of the Cincinnati Masters, and was part of the ATP Masters Series of the 2008 ATP Tour, and of the Tier III Series of the 2008 WTA Tour. Both the men's and the women's events took place at the Lindner Family Tennis Center in Mason, near Cincinnati, Ohio, United States, with the men playing from July 26 through August 3, 2008, and the women from August 9 through August 17, 2008.

The men's field was led by World No. 1, French Open and Wimbledon runner-up and Cincinnati Masters defending champion Roger Federer, ATP No. 2, French Open, Wimbledon and Canada Masters winner Rafael Nadal, and Australian Open titlist Novak Djokovic. Other top seeded players were ATP No. 4, Pörtschach and Warsaw titlist Nikolay Davydenko, Valencia and s'Hertogenbosch winner David Ferrer, Andy Roddick, James Blake and Andy Murray.

The women's draw featured Paris, Eastbourne and Montreal semifinalist, Standford finalist Marion Bartoli, Eastbourne runner-up and Wimbledon quarterfinalist Nadia Petrova, and Estoril, Barcelona winner Maria Kirilenko. Also competing were Strasbourg finalist, French Open and Wimbledon mixed doubles runner-up Katarina Srebotnik, Amelia Island quarterfinalist Amélie Mauresmo, Aleksandra Wozniak, Ekaterina Makarova and Tamira Paszek.

Finals

Men's singles

 Andy Murray defeated  Novak Djokovic 7–6(7–4), 7–6(7–5)
It was Andy Murray's 3rd title of the year, and his 6th overall. It was his 1st career Masters title.

Women's singles

 Nadia Petrova defeated  Nathalie Dechy 6–2, 6–1
It was Nadia Petrova's 1st title of the year, and her 8th overall.

Men's doubles

 Bob Bryan /  Mike Bryan defeated  Jonathan Erlich /  Andy Ram 4–6, 7–6(7–2), [10–7]

Women's doubles

 Maria Kirilenko /  Nadia Petrova defeated  Su-wei Hsieh /  Yaroslava Shvedova 6–3, 4–6, [10–8]

External links

Association of Tennis Professionals (ATP) tournament profile
Men's Singles draw
Men's Doubles draw
Men's Qualifying Singles draw
Women's Singles, Doubles and Qualifying Singles draws